Moira Shearer King, Lady Kennedy (17 January 1926 – 31 January 2006), was an internationally renowned Scottish ballet dancer and actress. She was famous for her performances in Powell and Pressburger's  The Red Shoes (1948) and The Tales of Hoffman (1951) and Michael Powell's Peeping Tom (1960). She has been portrayed on screen by Shannon Davidson in the award-winning short film Òran na h-Eala (2022) which explores her life changing decision to appear in The Red Shoes.

Early life
She was born Moira Shearer King at Morton Lodge in Dunfermline, Fife , Scotland, in 1926, the only child of civil engineer Harold Charles King and Margaret Crawford Reid, née Shearer. In 1931 her family moved to Ndola, Northern Rhodesia, where her father worked as a civil engineer and where she received her first dancing training under a former pupil of Enrico Cecchetti. She returned to Britain in 1936 and trained with Flora Fairbairn in London for a few months before she was accepted as a pupil by the Russian teacher Nicholas Legat. At his studio she met Mona Inglesby who gave Shearer a part in her new ballet Endymion, presented at an all star matinee at the Cambridge Theatre in 1938. After three years with Legat, she joined the Sadler's Wells Ballet School. After the outbreak of World War II, her parents took her to live in Scotland. She joined Mona Inglesby's International Ballet for its 1941 provincial tour and West End season before moving on to Sadler's Wells in 1942.

Film career
Shearer first came to the public's attention as Posy Fossil in the advertisements for the Noel Streatfeild book Ballet Shoes while she was training under Flora Fairbairn, a good friend of Streatfeild's.

She achieved international success with her first film role as Victoria Page in the Powell and Pressburger ballet-themed film The Red Shoes, (1948). Even her hair matched the titular footwear, and the role and film were so powerful that although she went on to star in other films and worked as a dancer for many decades, she is primarily known for playing "Vicky".

Shearer retired from ballet in 1953, but she continued to act, appearing as Titania in A Midsummer Night's Dream at the 1954 Edinburgh Festival. She worked again for Powell in the films The Tales of Hoffmann (1951) and Peeping Tom (1960), which was controversial at the time of release and damaged Powell's own career.

In 1972, she was chosen by the BBC to present the Eurovision Song Contest when it was staged at the Usher Hall in Edinburgh. She also wrote for The Daily Telegraph newspaper and gave talks on ballet worldwide.

The choreographer Gillian Lynne persuaded her to return to ballet in 1987 to play L. S. Lowry's mother in A Simple Man for the BBC.

Personal life
In 1950, Moira Shearer married journalist and broadcaster Ludovic Kennedy. They were married in the Chapel Royal in London's Hampton Court Palace. She and Kennedy had a son, Alastair, and three daughters, Ailsa, Rachel, and Fiona. She was given the honorary title of Lady Kennedy when her husband was knighted in 1994 for services to journalism.
Shearer died at the Radcliffe Infirmary, Oxford, England at the age of 80.

Filmography

See also
 List of Eurovision Song Contest presenters

References

External links

 
 
 
 The Ballerina Gallery – Moira Shearer
 Òran na h-Eala - UK Film Review
 BBC Obituary of Moira Shearer
 "The Daily Telegraph" Obituary of Moira Shearer
 The Times Online obituary of Moira Shearer
 

1926 births
2006 deaths
Dancers of The Royal Ballet
People educated at Bearsden Academy
People educated at Dunfermline High School
People from Dunfermline
Prima ballerinas
Scottish ballerinas
Scottish film actresses
Scottish television presenters
Scottish women television presenters
Wives of knights